The Australian Late Model Championship is a Dirt track racing championship held each year to determine the Australian Late model national champion. The championship is held over a single meeting (usually on consecutive nights) and has run annually since the 2001/02 season and is awarded to a different state of Australia each year.

The first championship was run at the Quit Motorplex (later renamed Perth Motorplex) in Kwinana Beach, Western Australia and was won by veteran Queensland driver Allan Butcher.

Western Australia's Brad Blake holds the record having won 5 of the 14 championships run until 2015. Blake also finished second in the championship on 3 occasions

The 2014/15 Australian championship was held at the Lucas Oil Kingaroy Speedway in Kingaroy, Queensland. Queensland driver and former Australian Super Sedan Champion Darren Kane won his first national Late Model championship.

The 2015/16 championship was scheduled to be held at the Perth Motorplex on 15–16 January 2016.

Winners since 2002

See also
 Motorsport in Australia

References

External links
Oz Late Model

Late Model Championship
Late Model Championship
Late Model